Academician Aliashraf Abdulhuseyn oghlu Alizade (1911–1985) was an Azerbaijani geologist. He was a full member and one of the founders of the Azerbaijan National Academy of Sciences (1945), and an Honorary Oilman of the USSR (1971). He was also a State Award laureate for the discovery and exploitation of new oil fields (1943) and for the preparation of the small electric perforator (1946). Yusif Haydar oglu Mammadaliyev was born on December 31, 1905, in Ordubad, Nakhchivan AR.

References

1911 births
1985 deaths
Stalin Prize winners
Recipients of the Order of Lenin
Recipients of the Order of the Red Banner of Labour
Azerbaijani geologists
Soviet geologists
Burials at II Alley of Honor